The 2018 Wartburg Knights football team represented Wartburg College as a member of the American Rivers Conference (ARC) during the 2018 NCAA Division III football season. Led by Rick Willis in his 20th season as head, the Knights compiled an overall record of 8–3 with a mark of 7–1 in conference play, winning ARC title for the second year in a row and earning an automatic bid to the NCAA Division III Football Championship playoffs. This was the 16th conference title for Wartburg and 10th for head coach Rick Willis. The team played home games at Walston-Hoover Stadium in Waverly, Iowa.

Schedule
Wartburg's 2018 regular season scheduled consisted of five home and five away games.

References

Wartburg
Wartburg Knights football seasons
Wartburg Knights football